Peak Hill may refer to:

Peak Hill, New South Wales, Australia
Peak Hill, Western Australia
Peak Hill, Devon, England
Peak Hill, Lincolnshire, England

See also
Peaks Hill, area of Purley, London, England